Thomas Dreßler is a retired East German swimmer who won a silver and a bronze medal in the 4×100 m medley relay at the European championships in 1985 and 1987, respectively. Between 1984 and 1988 he won ten national titles in butterfly events.

References

Year of birth missing (living people)
Living people
German male butterfly swimmers
German male swimmers
European Aquatics Championships medalists in swimming